Linden Wilkinson is an Australian film, television and theatre actress and writer.  She is perhaps best known for her recurring role in soap opera Home and Away playing 'The Believers' cult leader Mumma Rose.  Her other roles include appearances on Prisoner: Cell Block H, A Country Practice, Water Rats, and Packed to the Rafters.  Wilkinson spends most of her time acting in and writing theatre productions, she has worked extensively in State Theatre Companies in Adelaide, Melbourne and Auckland, some of her theatre credits are A Day in December, Family Favourites, Happy House Show, Nice Girls and Night of the Missing Bridegroom.  She began writing and script-editing for television series such as Ocean Girl and Outriders, and she has also written for two feature films, Moon River, an adaptation of the novel by Brenda Walker of the same name, and Pearls, a romantic comedy.

Filmography

Film
 1978: Third Person Plural - as Danny
 1984: My First Wife - as Ida Flagg
 1986: For Love Alone - as Miss Harviland
 1995: Vacant Possession - as Kate
 1997: Thank God He Met Lizzie - as Poppy
 2000: Looking for Alibrandi - as Mrs Barton
 2000: The Monkey's Mask - as Mrs. Norris

Television
 1979: Skyways - as Jill Ellis (1 episode)
 1980: Water Under the Bridge (TV film)
 1981–1983: Prisoner - as Nurse (1 episodes, 1981), as Pauline Carter  (6 episodes, 1983)
 1985: Winners - as Elsie Riordan (1 episode)
 1987–1992: A Country Practice - as Meg McKenzie (3 episodes, 1987/1988), as Trish Lennox (2 episodes, 1992)
 1988: Alterations (TV film) - as Martha
 1989: Dearest Enemy - as Alex Taylor
 1990: Raider of the South Seas (TV film) - as Elspeth Morrison
 1990: Come In Spinner - as Barbara Carstairs
 1992: The Time Game (TV film)
 1992: The Leaving of Liverpool (TV film) - Mrs. Hawkins
 1993: Seven Deadly Sins (mini-series) - as Pride
 1993: Police Rescue - as Mrs. Glasel (1 episode)
 1994: Escape from Jupiter - Beth
 1994: G.P. - as Daphne Bond (1 episode)
 1994: Mary (documentary) - Older Mary MacKillop
 1996: Naked: Stories of Men - as Ren (1 episode)
 1996: Fire - as Ms. Black (1 episode)
 1996–1999: Water Rats - as Moira Randall (2 episodes, 1996), as Elaine Johnson (1 episode, 1999)
 1996–2006: Home and Away - as Katherine Walker (6 episodes, 1996), as Mumma Rose (9 episodes, 2005/2006)
 1999: Murder Call - as Rose van Zeller (1 episode)
 2000: Marriage Acts (TV film) - as Miriam Hawkins
 2000: All Saints - as Helen Upton (1 episode)
 2009–2010: Packed to the Rafters - as Linda Brannon (2 episodes)

References

External links
 

Living people
Australian film actresses
Australian television actresses
Australian screenwriters
Year of birth missing (living people)
Australian stage actresses